Marie Řihošková (born 1981) is a Czech slalom canoeist who competed at the international from 1997 to 2010.

She won three medals in the K1 team event at the ICF Canoe Slalom World Championships with a gold (2010) and two silvers (2002, 2006). She also won three medals at the European Championships (1 gold and 2 silvers).

World Cup individual podiums

1 Pan American Championship counting for World Cup points

References

2010 ICF Canoe Slalom World Championships 11 September 2010 K1 women's team final results. – accessed 11 September 2010.

Czech female canoeists
Living people
1981 births
Medalists at the ICF Canoe Slalom World Championships